The Compaq C series was a series of Handheld PCs running on Windows CE 2.0, manufactured by Compaq from 1998.

Description
The C series replaced the Aero line of handheld PCs. It was succeeded, as with other HPCs manufactured by Compaq and HP, by the iPAQ line of Pocket PCs.

The C series featured an integrated 33.6kbit/s modem. For wireless data transfer, it sported an IrDA port.

An upgrade to Windows CE 2.11 could be purchased from Compaq for US$109.

Targus Inc. manufactured a leather portfolio case for the C series, under the Compaq brand.

References

C
Windows CE
Windows CE devices
Computer-related introductions in 1998